Basick Records is a British record label founded in 2005 by Nathan "Barley" Phillips and his half brother Jake Smith. Their business has since expanded into the Invictus Music & Media group, which includes Basick Records itself, the hardcore punk-oriented label Destroy Everything and the PR company Hold Tight! PR. Basick Records' first release was a compilation album, entitled, "Do You Feel This?", released on 8 August 2005. The first band to be signed to Basick was Fellsilent. They were also the first label to release material from Enter Shikari.

In 2011, Basick made a global distribution deal (excluding North America) with Warner ADA. Then, on 17 January 2012, they announced a North American distribution partnership with Prosthetic Records, in which selections from Basick's back catalog and all forthcoming releases would see distribution in North America from Prosthetic.

Roster

Current artists

A Dark Orbit
A Trust Unclean
Alaya
Aliases
Bad Sign
BEAR
Chimp Spanner
Create to Inspire
Damned Spring Fragrantia
Dissipate
Fall Of Minerva
First Signs of Frost
FOES 
Misery Signals
Murdock
No Consequence
Sikth
The Colour Line

Past artists

7 Horns 7 Eyes
Between the Screams
Blotted Science
Bury Tomorrow
Circles
Devil Sold His Soul
Evita
Fellsilent (except North America)
Gehenna VII VII VII
Glass Cloud
Intervals
Ion Dissonance
Moesaboa
Monuments
My Minds Weapon
Napoleon
No Made Sense
Shy Of The Depth
Skyharbor
Sleep Token
The Abner
The Algorithm
The Arusha Accord
The Comanche Cipher
The Escape
Uneven Structure
Visions
Without Thought

References

British record labels